Richard Alden Oliver, OAM (born 16 April 1955) is an Australian Paralympic athlete and wheelchair basketball player.  He was born in the South Australian town of Gawler. He participated in athletics at both the 1976 Toronto and 1980 Arnhem Paralympics, winning a bronze medal in 1980 in the Men's 100 m 4 event. He held the world records in the 100 m and 200 m events. He was part of the Australia men's national wheelchair basketball team at all Paralympics from 1976 to 1996. He won a gold medal as part of the winning team at the 1996 Atlanta Paralympics, for which he received a Medal of the Order of Australia.

References

External links
 

1955 births
Living people
Paralympic athletes of Australia
Paralympic wheelchair basketball players of Australia
Paralympic gold medalists for Australia
Paralympic bronze medalists for Australia
Paralympic medalists in athletics (track and field)
Athletes (track and field) at the 1976 Summer Paralympics
Athletes (track and field) at the 1980 Summer Paralympics
Wheelchair basketball players at the 1976 Summer Paralympics
Wheelchair basketball players at the 1980 Summer Paralympics
Wheelchair basketball players at the 1984 Summer Paralympics
Wheelchair basketball players at the 1988 Summer Paralympics
Wheelchair basketball players at the 1992 Summer Paralympics
Wheelchair basketball players at the 1996 Summer Paralympics
Medalists at the 1980 Summer Paralympics
Medalists at the 1996 Summer Paralympics
Australian male wheelchair racers
Recipients of the Medal of the Order of Australia
Sportsmen from South Australia
People from Gawler, South Australia